Angus Gibb was a former Australian professional soccer player who played as a half-back in left and right positions for Australian clubs and the Australia national soccer team. Gibb is known as an unknown player for being mistaken by Alex Gibb by Football Federation Australia. He received cap no. 51A on revising Australia's official caps list.

Early life
Gibb was born in Fort Worth, Texas, United States. He moved to Brisbane and started playing at East Brisbane State School.

International career
Gibb played for the Australia national soccer team in a left-half position, and was capped only once on 5 June 1933 against New Zealand.

Career statistics

International

References

Australian soccer players
Association football midfielders
Australia international soccer players
Year of birth missing
Year of death missing